Wolffia is a genus of aquatic plants with a cosmopolitan distribution. They include the smallest flowering plants on Earth. Commonly called watermeal or duckweed, these aquatic plants resemble specks of cornmeal floating on the water. Individuals often float together in pairs or form floating mats with related plants, such as Lemna and Spirodela species.

Description 
Wolffia are free-floating aquatic plants with fronds that are nearly spherical to cylindrical in shape and lack airspaces or veins. They do not have roots. Their rarely seen flowers originate from a cavity on the upper surface of the frond, and each flower has one stamen and one pistil.

Although Wolffia can reproduce by seed, they usually use vegetative reproduction. A mother frond has a terminal conical cavity from which it produces daughter fronds.

Physiology 
The growth rate of Wolffia varies within and among species. The rates of photosynthesis and respiration also vary proportionately to growth rate. The fastest growth rate (in fact, the fastest growth rate of any flowering plant) is shown by a clone of Wolffia microscopica, with a doubling time of 29.3 hours.

As food 
Wolffia are a potential high-protein human food source. One species, W. microscopica, is over 20% protein by dry weight and has high content of essential amino acids. They have historically been collected from the water and eaten as a vegetable in Asia.

Species

, eleven species are accepted on Kew's Plants of the World Online:
Wolffia angusta 
Wolffia arrhiza 
Wolffia australiana 
Wolffia borealis 
Wolffia brasiliensis 
Wolffia columbiana 
Wolffia cylindracea 
Wolffia elongata 
Wolffia globosa 
Wolffia microscopica 
Wolffia neglecta

References

External links 
The Duckweed Genome Project from Rutgers University
 
Landolt, E. (1986) Biosystematic investigations in the family of duckweeds (Lemnaceae). Vol. 2. The family of Lemnaceae - A monographic study. Part 1 of the monograph: Morphology; karyology; ecology; geographic distribution; systematic position; nomenclature; descriptions. Veröff. Geobot. Inst., Stiftung Rübel, ETH, Zurich.

Lemnoideae
Araceae genera
Freshwater plants